The 2019–20 Hero Santosh Trophy qualifiers was the qualifying round for the 2019–20 Santosh Trophy, the premier competition in India for teams representing their regional and state football associations.

East Zone
The East Zone matches of the Santosh Trophy will be held at Kalyani, West Bengal.

Group A

Group B

North Zone
The North Zone matches of the Santosh Trophy will start on 22 September 2019 in Haldwani, Uttarakhand.

Group A

Group B

North-East Zone
The North-East Zone matches of the Santosh Trophy will start on 22 September 2019 in Agartala, Tripura.

Group A

Group B

West Zone
The West Zone matches of the Santosh Trophy will start on 23 September 2019 in Mapusa, Goa.

Group A

Group B

South Zone
The South Zone matches of the Santosh Trophy started on 5 November 2019.

Group A

Group B

References

External links
 Santosh Trophy Fixtures  
 Santosh Trophy on the All India Football Federation website .

2019–20 Santosh Trophy